An Identity card of a citizen of the Republic of Azerbaijan is an identity document in the territory of the Republic. It is forbidden to obtain it by using illegal way and to refuse to issue or change the identity card. When the identity card is lost, the holder or the legitimate representative of the holder must immediately apply to the state body issuing the document. Since 1 April 2021, it can be used as a travel document to enter Turkey (only directly from Azerbaijan).

See also 
Azerbaijani nationality law
Azerbaijani passport
Driving licence in Azerbaijan

References 

Identity documents by country
Society of Azerbaijan